Mudu Station is a station of Line 1, Suzhou Rail Transit. The station is located in Wuzhong District of Suzhou. It has been in use since April 28, 2012, the same time of the operation of Line 1.

Station

Accessible information
 Mudu Station is a fully accessible station, this station equipped with wheelchair accessible elevators, blind paths with bumps, and wheelchair ramps. These facilities can help people with disabilities, seniors, youths, and pregnancies travel through Suzhou Rail Transit system.

Station configurations
L1 (First Floor/Street Level): Entrances/Exits (stairs and escalators); and elevators with wheelchair accessible ramps.

B1 (Mezzanine/Station Hall Level): Station Control Room; Customer Service; Automatic Ticket Vending Machines; Automatic Fee Collection Systems with turnstiles; stairs and escalators; and elevators with wheelchair accessible ramps.

B2 (Platform Level): Platform; toilet; stairs and escalators; elevators with wheelchair accessible ramps.

Station layout

First & last trains

Exits information
Exit 1: South-West Corner of Jinshan Lu and Zhuyuan Lu

Exit 2: South-East Corner of Jinshan Lu and Zhuyuan Lu

Exit 3: North-East Corner of Jinshan Lu and Zhuyuan Lu

Exit 4: North-East Corner of Jinshan Lu and Zhuyuan Lu

Exit 5: North-West Corner of Jinshan Lu and Zhuyuan Lu

Local attractions
Lingyan Shan tourism scenic area
Tianping Shan tourism scenic area
Mudu Town
Xiangxie Holiday Hill Villa
Zhonghuayuan Hotel
Taohuayuan Villa

Bus connections
Bus Stop: MuDu HuanChengShuNiuZhan - Connection Bus Routes: 65, 338, 446, 508, 583, 621, 668, 691, 692

Bus Stop: ZhongHuaYuan DaJiuDian - Connection Bus Routes: 2, 38, 64, 69,  69 Lessened Line, 326, 622, 661, 665

Bus Stop: Nan Bang - Connection Bus Routes: 338, 662

Bus Stop: Xinhua Lu - Connection Bus Routes: 2, 38, 64, 69,  69 Lessened Line, 326, 622, 661, 665, 4

References

Railway stations in Jiangsu
Suzhou Rail Transit stations
Railway stations in China opened in 2012